Yakich is a surname, probably coming from Croatian Jakić. Notable people with the surname include:

Fred Yakich, Australian rugby league footballer
Nick Yakich (1940–2019), Australian rugby league footballer, brother of Fred
Mark Yakich, American poet, author, and English professor